The Africa Cup Baseball Championship is the main international baseball competition in Africa. The Africa Cup Baseball Championship has not been played with the frequency, regularity or history of the European Championship, Asian Championship or South American Championship. Instead, it has been more irregular, like the Oceania Championship.

Results

Medal table

References

African Championship